Earl of Leinster was a title in the Peerage of Ireland. It was created on 3 March 1646 for Robert Cholmondeley. He had already been created a baronet, of Cholmondeley in the County of Chester, in the Baronetage of England on 29 June 1611, and Viscount Cholmondeley in the Peerage of Ireland on 2 July 1628. He was created Baron Cholmondeley in the Peerage of England on 1 September 1648. Lord Leinster died childless in 1659 and the titles became extinct. However, the viscountcy of Cholmondeley was revived two years later in favour of his nephew Robert Cholmondeley (son of Hugh Cholmondeley), who is the ancestor of the Marquesses of Cholmondeley. Also, the Earl's other brother Thomas Cholmondeley was the ancestor of the Barons Delamere.

The family surname is pronounced "Chumley".

Earls of Leinster (1646)
Robert Cholmondeley, 1st Earl of Leinster (1584–1659)

Earls of Leinster (1721)
Sophia Charlotte von Kielmansegg, Countess of Leinster (1675–1725), life peerage.

See also
Marquess of Cholmondeley
Baron Delamere

References

 

Extinct earldoms in the Peerage of Ireland
Leinster
1611 establishments in England
Noble titles created in 1646
Noble titles created in 1721